Sarabhojirajapuram is a village in the Papanasam taluk of Thanjavur district, Tamil Nadu, India. The village was established as an agraharam by the Thanjavur Maratha ruler Serfoji I.

Demographics 

As per the 2001 census, Sarabhojirajapuram had a total population of 2612 with 1269 males and 1343 females. The sex ratio was 1058. The literacy rate was 84.74.

References 

 

Villages in Thanjavur district